Armitage is a Chicago Transit Authority "L" elevated station with two side platforms in the Lincoln Park neighborhood of Chicago, Illinois, on the Brown Line; Purple Line express trains also stop at the station during weekday rush hours. Red Line trains pass through on the middle tracks, but do not stop. Just south of the platforms is where the Red Line tracks descend into the State Street subway. It is located near the Lincoln Park Zoo, and is accessible via the 73 Armitage bus route.

History

Armitage opened on June 9, 1900 as a local station on the original Northwestern Elevated Railroad route from Lake and Wells in downtown to Wilson Station. An interlocking tower was added on the western platform following the construction of the State Street subway. From the late 1940s, Armitage became a station on the Ravenswood route (now the Brown Line). Purple Line express trains began stopping at the station in 1998 as part of an effort to help alleviate congestion on the Brown Line.

Brown Line Capacity Expansion Project
Armitage was renovated as part of the Brown Line Capacity Expansion Project. Many historic elements, including the station house, were preserved and renovated; the platforms were extended to enable eight-car trains; and elevators added to meet ADA accessibility requirements. The renovated station reopened on June 5, 2008.

Bus connections
CTA
  73 Armitage

Notes and references

Notes

References

External links 

 Train schedule (PDF) at CTA official site
Armitage Avenue entrance from Google Maps Street View

CTA Brown Line stations
CTA Purple Line stations
Railway stations in the United States opened in 1900